"Blind" is a song by American rock band Talking Heads. It was written by David Byrne, the band's lead vocalist and guitarist, and produced by Steve Lillywhite with the rest of the band. The track is on the band's eighth and final studio album, Naked (1988).

The track was released as a single with the B-side "Bill", which was not available on the original vinyl album but was released on the compact disc and cassette.

Recording
"Studio Davout in Paris used to be a big movie theatre," wrote bassist Tina Weymouth of the song 'Blind' in the liner notes of Once in a Lifetime: The Best of Talking Heads. "You can fit a huge orchestra in the big room (which is what Michel Legrand does). David uncharacteristically wore a suit to his vocal session, as well as a pair of clear glass black horn-rims. He looked so small as he sat at a large office desk (bureau, in French), with a tiny desk lamp shining down on some lyric-less blank paper (presumably there some squiggly lines in a strange shorthand notation to indicate what and where he would sing). His hands lay palms down, fingers splayed to either side of the paper, and he never moved them except during the instrumental section, to reach for a glass of water that stood in the shadows to one side. The entire vocal was written improvisationally with those in the control room making suggestions as to which parts worked and David memorizing them on the spot. The only lyric that came from that improvisation was the chorus, in which he sang 'Blahnd, blahnd, blahnd'. His head moved like a muppet and we all watched, fascinated, as if he were a bug on a pin under a microscope. Jonathan Demme, you shoulda been there with your camera! [referring to Demme's direction of Stop Making Sense, Talking Heads' 1984 concert film]"

Music video
Directed by Annabel Jankel and Rocky Morton, the music video for "Blind" is unusual among Talking Heads' videography in that it portrays an elaborate narrative over the course of the song. Apparently lampooning the 1988 United States presidential election, the video portrays a group of Americans (among them a literal Bible thumper) electing a sentient, malevolent monkey wrench into public office. At its victory rally, the wrench, shown bearing human teeth, continuously shouts and spits into a jubilant crowd as his aides smugly watch on. However, as the video progresses, the crowd becomes more aware of the wrench's malevolence, with their joy turning into confusion, fear, and eventually distress. And the wrench can later be seen with an aide arguing then biting off the aide's ear (check at 1:58). 

Midway through the video, a group of people at the front of the crowd investigate a dragon's-head faucet at the face of the wrench's podium; an aide then fires his gun into the faucet, only to be blown back into the crowd behind him.

Eventually, the wrench is overthrown by both the crowd and his own lackeys, being uprooted from his podium and thrust into the distance. The wrench shrinks in size as this goes on, eventually reaching the size of a toy before being caught by a smiling infant. The video ends with a freeze-frame shot of the infant's fist clutching the once-malevolent tool.

At various points, the video intercuts to footage of a shirtless David Byrne against a solid black background, singing and gesticulating at the camera. Several of these interludes utilize masking effects to superimpose either duplicates of Byrne's face or the faces of his bandmates against his own.

Critical reception
Lisa Tilston of Record Mirror described the song as "freakily funky and disappointingly tuneless", but added it was "probably a grower in the classic Heads mould".

Cash Box said that "Byrne has hidden a sly little comment about turning away from life in the Talking Heads high quality bushes of funky rock."

Charts

References

External links
 

1988 singles
Talking Heads songs
Songs written by David Byrne
EMI Records singles
Song recordings produced by Steve Lillywhite
1987 songs
Music videos directed by Annabel Jankel
Music videos directed by Rocky Morton